Cao Yanhua also Tsao Yen-hua is a Chinese former international table tennis player.

Career
From 1978 to 1985, Yanhua won many medals in singles, doubles, and team events in the Asian Table Tennis Championships and in the World Table Tennis Championships.

The eleven World Championship medals included seven gold medals; two in the singles at the 1983 World Table Tennis Championships and 1985 World Table Tennis Championships, three in the team, one in the mixed doubles with Cai Zhenhua and one in the women's doubles with Zhang Deying.

See also
 List of table tennis players
 List of World Table Tennis Championships medalists

References

Year of birth missing (living people)
Living people
Chinese female table tennis players
Asian Games medalists in table tennis
Table tennis players at the 1982 Asian Games
Table tennis players at the 1978 Asian Games
Table tennis players from Shanghai
Medalists at the 1978 Asian Games
Medalists at the 1982 Asian Games
Asian Games gold medalists for China
Asian Games bronze medalists for China